Killduff is an unincorporated community in southeastern Jasper County, Iowa, United States.  It lies along local roads southeast of the city of Newton, the county seat of Jasper County.

History
Killduff has a post office which opened on July 2, 1883.

Killduff was once located on the Iowa Central Railway. Killduff's population was 69 in 1902, and 85 in 1925.

In 1912, Killduff contained a post office, two stores, a lumber yard, and a blacksmith shop.

References

Unincorporated communities in Jasper County, Iowa
Populated places established in 1883
Unincorporated communities in Iowa